The following is a list of ecoregions in Canada as identified by the World Wide Fund for Nature (WWF).

Terrestrial ecoregions
The terrestrial ecoregions of Canada are all within the Nearctic realm, which includes most of North America. The Nearctic, together with Eurasia's Palearctic realm, constitutes the Holarctic realm of the Northern Hemisphere.

British Columbia is the most biodiverse province with 18 ecoregions across 4 biomes. By contrast, Prince Edward Island is the least biodiverse with just one ecoregion - the Gulf of St. Lawrence lowland forests - encompassing the entire province.

Marine ecoregions
Canada is unique among countries in that it borders three marine realms: the Arctic, Temperate Northern Atlantic, and Temperate Northern Pacific. These realms can be further subdivided into three marine biomes and fifteen marine ecoregions based upon biological distinctiveness.

Quebec is the only province that borders both the Arctic and Temperate Northern Atlantic realms.

See also

Canadian Arctic tundra
Forests of Canada
List of ecoregions in the United States (WWF)

References

 
Canada
Ecoregions
01
Canada
Ecoregions